Black Farm, also known as the Isaac Collins Farm, is a historic farm in Hopkinton, Rhode Island bounded by Woodville Alton Road (Rhode Island Route 112) and Wood Road.  The  was first developed by John Collins beginning in 1710, and saw agricultural use for over 200 years.  The main house dates to the late 18th century, and is a 1-1/2 story gambrel-roofed post-and-beam structure.  Other outbuildings include 19th century barns, a corn crib, and a guest cottage added in the 1930s.  Set some distance off from this complex of buildings is the foundational remnant of what was probably an ice house: it consists of granite blocks and is eight feet in height.

In 1991 the farm was purchased by the state.  A lot containing the farmstead complex was sold into private hands with a preservation easement, and the rest of the farm property is now conservation land.

The farm was added to the National Register of Historic Places in 1995.

See also
National Register of Historic Places listings in Washington County, Rhode Island

References

External links
RI Department of Environmental Management Newsletter article on Black Farm Management Area

Farms on the National Register of Historic Places in Rhode Island
Farms in Washington County, Rhode Island
Hopkinton, Rhode Island
National Register of Historic Places in Washington County, Rhode Island